Squalene is an organic compound. It is a triterpenoid with the formula C30H50. It is a colourless oil, although impure samples appear yellow. It was originally obtained from shark liver oil (hence its name, as Squalus is a genus of sharks). An estimated 12% of bodily squalene in humans is found in sebum. Squalene has a role in topical skin lubrication and protection.

Most plants, fungi, and animals produce squalene as biochemical precursor in sterol biosynthesis, including cholesterol and steroid hormones in the human body. It is also an intermediate in the biosynthesis of hopanoids in many bacteria. 

Squalene is an important ingredient in some vaccine adjuvants: The Novartis and GlaxoSmithKline adjuvants are called MF59 and AS03, respectively.

Role in triterpenoid synthesis
Squalene is a biochemical precursor to both steroids and hopanoids. For sterols, the squalene conversion begins with oxidation (via squalene monooxygenase) of one of its terminal double bonds, resulting in 2,3-oxidosqualene. It then undergoes an enzyme-catalysed cyclisation to produce lanosterol, which can be elaborated into other steroids such as cholesterol and ergosterol in a multistep process by the removal of three methyl groups, the reduction of one double bond by NADPH and the migration of the other double bond. In many plants, this is then converted into stigmasterol, while in many fungi, it is the precursor to ergosterol.

The biosynthetic pathway is found in many bacteria, and most eukaryotes, though has not been found in Archaea.

Production

Biosynthesis
Squalene is biosynthesised by coupling two molecules of farnesyl pyrophosphate. The condensation requires NADPH and the enzyme squalene synthase.

Industry

Synthetic Squalene is prepared commercially from geranylacetone.

Shark conservation 
In 2020, conservationists raised concerns about the potential slaughter of sharks to obtain squalene for a COVID-19 vaccine.

Environmental and other concerns over shark hunting have motivated its extraction from other sources. Biosynthetic processes use genetically engineered yeast or bacteria.

Uses

As an adjuvant in vaccines

Immunologic adjuvants are substances, administered in conjunction with a vaccine, that stimulate the immune system and increase the response to the vaccine. Squalene is not itself an adjuvant, but it has been used in conjunction with surfactants in certain adjuvant formulations.

An adjuvant using squalene is Seqirus' proprietary MF59, which is added to influenza vaccines to help stimulate the human body's immune response through production of CD4 memory cells. It is the first oil-in-water influenza vaccine adjuvant to be commercialised in combination with a seasonal influenza virus vaccine. It was developed in the 1990s by researchers at Ciba-Geigy and Chiron; both companies were subsequently acquired by Novartis. Novartis was later acquired by CSL Bering and created the company Seqirus. It is present in the form of an emulsion and is added to make the vaccine more immunogenic. However, the mechanism of action remains unknown. MF59 is capable of switching on a number of genes that partially overlap with those activated by other adjuvants. How these changes are triggered is unclear; to date, no receptors responding to MF59 have been identified. One possibility is that MF59 affects the cell behaviour by changing the lipid metabolism, namely by inducing accumulation of neutral lipids within the target cells. An influenza vaccine called FLUAD which used MF59 as an adjuvant was approved for use in the US in people 65 years of age and older, beginning with the 2016-2017 flu season.

A 2009 meta-analysis assessed data from 64 clinical trials of influenza vaccines with the squalene-containing adjuvant MF59 and compared them to the effects of vaccines with no adjuvant. The analysis reported that the adjuvated vaccines were associated with slightly lower risks of chronic diseases, but that neither type of vaccines altered the rate of autoimmune diseases; the authors concluded that their data "supports the good safety profile associated with MF59-adjuvated influenza vaccines and suggests there may be a clinical benefit over non-MF59-containing vaccines".

Safety
Toxicology studies indicate that in the concentrations used in cosmetics, squalene has low acute toxicity, and is not a significant contact allergen or irritant.

The World Health Organization and the US Department of Defense have both published extensive reports that emphasise that squalene is naturally occurring, even in oils of human fingerprints. The WHO goes further to explain that squalene has been present in over 22 million flu vaccines given to patients in Europe since 1997 without significant vaccine-related adverse events.

Controversies
Attempts to link squalene to Gulf War Syndrome have been debunked.

References

External links
 Squalene MS Spectrum

Chemical synthesis
Chemical processes
Molecular biology
Biotechnology
Biochemistry
Toxicology
Polyenes
Biomolecules
Hydrocarbons
Triterpenes
Immunology
Vaccination